Screams of Cold Winter is an English alternative metal band formed in late 2007 in Preston, Lancashire, England.  

They have established themselves within the alternative metal scene, they have supported the Sophie Lancaster Foundation by playing at Mansfield's Intake Club and have also played at Blackpool Rockquest.

Band members
Trish - Vocals 
Spike - Guitar
Lundie - Guitar 
Paul - Keyboards 
Dugald - Bass 
Claire - Drums

Discography
Screams of Cold Winter (4-track EP)

Reviews
Sarah Angell of Devolution Magazine described Screams of Cold Winter's sound as "traditional goth meets... modern electronic style" and recommended the band's EP for "any fan of traditional goth music".

References

External links
Screams of Cold Winter at Last.fm

English heavy metal musical groups